6 Way St. (originally named Level 3:16) is an American Christian R&B and Christian hip hop group signed to the Cross Movement Records. They are based out of Indianapolis, Indiana. The group consists of two male M.C.'s, three female vocalists and one female DJ. 

In 2011, the group reached the Billboard charts with their debut album under the original band name Level 3:16.

Background
The Christian hip hop and Christian R&B group, 6 Way St. started out as 'Level 3:16'. The two male M.C's are  Steve "STV G" Gaskin and Chris Tabron. The three female vocalists are Kristin "K Mase" Mason, Candace Jones, and Crystal Whitaker. The female DJ is Kristen "K.B." Betts. They are based out of Indianapolis, Indiana.

History
In 2009, the six members met while on a summer trip near Indianapolis, IN. The group was part of The Impact Movement at Keynote. This was a program dedicated to training Christian musicians to establish programs, schedule tours and create outreach seminars across the United States.

Debut Album (2010)
The band launched their debut album, Level 3:16, on December 28, 2010 under the name 'Level 3:16'. The album charted on two Billboard charts. Rapzilla reviewed the album giving it a three and a half out of five rating, and Cross Rhythms rated the album a ten out of ten. 

The group subsequently changed their name to 6 Way St.

Members
 Steve "STV G" Gaskin - M.C.
 Chris Tabron - M.C.
 Kristin Mason  (K Mase) - vocalist
 Candace Jones - vocalist
 Crystal Whitaker - vocalist
 Kristen "K.B." Betts - DJ

Discography

Studio albums

As Level 3:16

References

Musical groups established in 2009
Christian hip hop groups
Musical groups from Indiana
American hip hop groups
Midwest hip hop groups
2009 establishments in Indiana